

579001–579100 

|-bgcolor=#f2f2f2
| colspan=4 align=center | 
|}

579101–579200 

|-bgcolor=#f2f2f2
| colspan=4 align=center | 
|}

579201–579300 

|-bgcolor=#f2f2f2
| colspan=4 align=center | 
|}

579301–579400 

|-bgcolor=#f2f2f2
| colspan=4 align=center | 
|}

579401–579500 

|-bgcolor=#f2f2f2
| colspan=4 align=center | 
|}

579501–579600 

|-id=513
| 579513 Saselemér ||  ||  (1930–1998) was a Hungarian physicist, teacher and science communicator, who hosted several popular TV programms. || 
|}

579601–579700 

|-bgcolor=#f2f2f2
| colspan=4 align=center | 
|}

579701–579800 

|-bgcolor=#f2f2f2
| colspan=4 align=center | 
|}

579801–579900 

|-id=890
| 579890 Mocnik ||  || Teo Močnik (born 1989), a Slovenian astronomer and discoverer of minor planets with EURONEAR. He currently studies exoplanets at Gemini North Observatory, Hawaii. || 
|}

579901–580000 

|-bgcolor=#f2f2f2
| colspan=4 align=center | 
|}

References 

579001-580000